The history of Cambodian art stretches back centuries to ancient times, but the most famous period is undoubtedly the Khmer art of the Khmer Empire (802–1431), especially in the area around Angkor and the mainly 12th-century temple-complex of Angkor Wat, initially Hindu and subsequently Buddhist. After the collapse of the empire these and other sites were abandoned and overgrown, allowing much of the era's stone carving and architecture to survive to the present day.  Traditional Cambodian arts and crafts include textiles, non-textile weaving, silversmithing, stone carving, lacquerware, ceramics, wat murals, and kite-making.

Beginning in the mid-20th century, a tradition of modern art began in Cambodia, though in the later 20th century both traditional and modern arts declined for several reasons, including the killing of artists by the Khmer Rouge.  The country has experienced a recent artistic revival due to increased support from governments, NGOs, and foreign tourists.

In pre-colonial Cambodia, art and crafts were generally produced either by rural non-specialists for practical use or by skilled artists producing works for the Royal Palace.  In modern Cambodia, many artistic traditions entered a period of decline or even ceased to be practiced, but the country has experienced a recent artistic revival as the tourist market has increased and governments and NGOs have contributed to the preservation of Cambodian culture.

Stone carving

Cambodia's best-known stone carving adorns the temples of Angkor, which are "renowned for the scale, richness and detail of their sculpture". In modern times, however, the art of stone carving became rare, largely because older sculptures survived undamaged for centuries (eliminating the need for replacements) and because of the use of cement molds for modern temple architecture.  By the 1970s and 1980s, the craft of stone carving was nearly lost.

During the late 20th century, however, efforts to restore Angkor resulted in a new demand for skilled stone carvers to replace missing or damaged pieces, and a new tradition of stone carving is arising to meet this need. Most modern carving is traditional-style, but some carvers are experimenting with contemporary designs.  Interest is also renewing for using stone carving in modern wats.  Modern carvings are typically made from Banteay Meanchey sandstone, though stone from Pursat and Kompong Thom is also used.

Murals
Because of destruction during recent war, few historic wat murals remain in Cambodia. In the 1960s, art historians Guy and Jacqueline Nafilyan photographed 19th-century murals, providing a record of this lost cultural heritage. The best known surviving murals are at the Silver Pagoda in Phnom Penh, Wat Rajabo in Siem Reap province, and Wat Kompong Tralach Leu in Kompong Chhnang Province. In the last decade, wat murals have seen a resurgence, but Cambodia's surviving older murals are generally more refined and detailed.

Textiles

Silk weaving in Cambodia has a long history. The practice dates to as early as the late 13th century. According to Zhou Daguan's record, "None of the locals produces silk. Nor do the women know how to stitch and darn with a needle and thread. The only thing they can do is weave cotton from Kapok. Even then they cannot spin the yarn, but just use their hands to gather the cloth into strands. 

They do not use a loom for weaving. Instead they just wind one end of the cloth around their waist, hang the other end over a window, and use a bamboo tube as a shuttle". Interestingly, Zhou mentioned that people from Siam brought silk production into Angkor, "In recent years people from Siam have come to live in Cambodia, and unlike the locals they engage in silk production.  The mulberry trees they grow and the silkworms they raise all came from Siam. They themselves weave the silk into clothes made of a black patterned satiny silk".

There are two main types of Cambodian weaving.  The ikat technique, which produces patterned fabric, is quite complex.  To create patterns, weavers tie-dye portions of weft yarn before weaving begins.  Patterns are diverse and vary by region; common motifs include lattice, stars, and spots.  The second weaving technique, unique to Cambodia, is called "uneven twill". It yields single or two-color fabrics, which are produced by weaving three threads so that the "color of one thread dominates on one side of the fabric, while the two others determine the colour on the reverse side." Traditionally, Cambodian textiles have employed natural dyes.  Red dye comes from lac insect nests, blue dye from indigo, yellow and green dye from  bark, and black dye from ebony bark.

Cambodia's modern silk-weaving centers are Takéo, Battambang, Beanteay Meanchey, Siem Reap and Kampot provinces.    Silk-weaving has seen a major revival recently, with production doubling over the past ten years. This has provided employment for many rural women. Cambodian silk is generally sold domestically, where it is used in sampot (wrap skirts), furnishings, and pidan (pictorial tapestries), but interest in international trade is increasing.

Cotton textiles have also played a significant role in Cambodian culture. Though today Cambodia imports most of its cotton, traditionally woven cotton remains popular. Rural women often weave homemade cotton fabric, which is used in garments and for household purposes. Krama, the traditional check scarves worn almost universally by Cambodians, are made of cotton.

Non-textile weaving

Many Cambodian farmers weave baskets for household use or as a supplemental source of income.  Most baskets are made of thinly cut bamboo.  Regions known for basketry include Siem Reap and Kampong Cham. Mat weaving (tbanh kantuel) is a common seasonal occupation. They are most commonly made from reeds, either left a natural tan color or dyed in deep jewel tones. The region of Cambodia best known for mat weaving is the Mekong floodplain, especially around Lvea Em district. Mats are commonly laid out for guests and are important building materials for homes. Wicker and rattan crafts made from dryandra trees are also significant.  Common wicker and rattan products include walls, mats, furniture, and other household items.

Lacquerware

The height of Cambodian traditional lacquerware was between the 12th and 16th centuries; some examples of work from this era, including gilded Buddha images and betel boxes, have survived to the present day.  Lacquerware was traditionally colored black using burnt wood, representing the underworld; red using mercury, representing the earth; and yellow using arsenic, representing the heavens.  Lacquer on Angkorian stone dates to the 15th or 16th century.

In modern Cambodia, the art of lacquerwork nearly faded into oblivion: few lacquer trees survived, and lacquer was unavailable in local markets.  Today's revival is still in its infancy, but 100 lacquer artists have been trained by a French expert under the guidance of Artisans d'Angkor, a company that produces traditional crafts in village workshops.  Some artists are "beginning to experiment with different techniques and styles...to produce modern and striking effects."

Blacksmithing

Archeological finds near Angkorian sites in the former Khmer empire have suggested a wide variety and quality of blacksmithing. Khmer swords became part of Khmer culture and literature through influences that were not only mythogical, as the Chandrahas sword represented in Angkor Wat and found in the Reamker or legendary as the sword that Preah Bath Ponhea Yath, who was the last king of the Angkorian Empire, drew out as he led a victorious battle against the Siamese invaders to take back the ancient Khmer capital in the 14th century. 

Blacksmithing in Cambodia is essentially linked to the needs of agriculture, and for that reasons, it remains one of the skills which survived best through the tragic years of the Khmer Rouges. In this day, the vast majority of blacksmiths in Cambodia draws from the Cham minority. Recently, high-end quality blacksmithing has also emerged in Cambodia producing knives and swords in Khmer and Japanese styles.

Silversmithing

Silversmithing in Cambodia dates back centuries.  The Royal Palace traditionally patronized silversmiths' workshops, and silversmiths remain concentrated at Kompong Luong, near the former royal capital Oudong.  Silver was made into a variety of items, including weaponry, coins, ceremonial objects used in funerary and religious rituals, and betel boxes.

During Cambodia's colonial period, artisans at the School of Fine Art produced celebrated silverwork, and by the late 1930s there were more than 600 silversmiths. Today, silverwork is popular for boxes, jewellery, and souvenir items; these are often adorned with fruit, fire, and Angkor-inspired motifs.  Men produce most of the forms for such work, but women often complete the intricate filigree.

Ceramics

Cambodian pottery traditions date to 5000 BCE.  Ceramics were mostly used for domestic purposes such as holding food and water. There is no evidence that Khmer ceramics were ever exported, though ceramics were imported from elsewhere in Asia beginning in the 10th century. Ceramics in the shape of birds, elephants, rabbits, and other animals were popular between the 11th and 13th centuries.

Potting traditionally was done either on a pottery wheel or using shaping tools such as paddles and anvils. Firing was done in clay kilns, which could reach temperatures of 1,000–1,200 °C, or in the open air, at temperatures of around 700 °C. Primarily green and brown glazes were used.  In rural Cambodia, traditional pottery methods remained.  Many pieces are hand-turned and fired on an open fire without glaze.  The country's major center for pottery is Kompong Chhnang Province.

In modern Cambodia, the art of glazed ceramics faded into oblivion: the technique of stoneware stop to be used around 14th century, at the end of Angkor era. Today this technique begin a slow revival through a Belgian ceramist who founded the Khmer Ceramics & Fine Arts Center, in Siem Reap, the organization lead vocational training and researches about this lost skill.

Kites
Cambodia's kite-making and kite-flying tradition, which dates back many centuries, was revived in the early 1990s and is now extremely popular throughout the country. Kites are generally flown at night during the northeast monsoon season. A bow attached to the kites resonates in the wind, producing a musical sound.

Modern and contemporary visual arts
 
Cambodia's tradition of modern (representational) drawing, painting, and sculpture was established in the late 1940s at the School of Cambodian Arts (later called the University of Fine Arts), where it occupied much of the school's curriculum a decade later.  These developments were supported by the government, which encouraged new areas of specialization (e.g. design and modern painting) at the school and purchased modern art for the Prime Minister's residences and for government buildings.

Galleries opened in Phnom Penh during the 1960s, and cultural centers hosted exhibitions of modern paintings and provided art libraries. One important painter of the 1960s was Nhek Dim; he has become the painter of reference for modern painters.  During the subsequent Khmer Rouge era, many artists were killed and art production nearly ceased.

After the fall of the Khmer Rouge, artists and professors returned the University of Fine Arts to rebuild arts training.  Socialist Bloc governments sponsored the education of young art students in Poland, Bulgaria, the former Soviet Union, and Hungary during the late 1980s and early 1990s. Other local efforts aimed to re-establish workshops, collect documents, and preserve traditional knowledge.

Though several galleries present changing exhibitions in Phnom Penh, the vast majority of artists cannot support themselves through exhibitions and sales of modern work.  Artists generally earn income from Angkor-inspired art for tourists or from painting commercial signs and large reproductions that in the West would be mechanically produced.

Several broad schools of art exist among modern Cambodian artists.  Some artists, including Som Samai (a silversmith), An Sok (a mask-maker), and Chet Chan (a painter) follow colonial traditions to produce traditional Khmer art. Chhim Sothy's work is also derived from these traditions.   Many young artists who studied abroad in the 1980s, including Phy Chan Than, Soeung Vannara, Long Sophea, and Prom Sam An, have presented a modern Khmer art forms combining subjects from Khmer art with Western modernism. Other notable Cambodian artists include Leang Seckon, Pich Sopheap, Svay Ken, Asasax, Chhan Dina, Patrick Samnang Mey, Lam Soeung, and Chhorn Bun Son. During the 1990s, Cambodia saw the return of many members of the Khmer diaspora, including several internationally recognized artists.  Among these are Marine Ky and Chath Piersath.

References

Works cited

Further reading
Jessup, Helen Ibbetson, Art and Architecture of Cambodia, 2004, Thames & Hudson (World of Art),

External links
History behind Cambodian Hindu temple "Angkor Wat"
 Cambodia Cultural Profile
 Cambodian masks

 
Cambodian culture
Cambodia
km:សិល្បៈខ្មែរ